Buckton Creek is a stream in Alberta, Canada.

Buckton Creek has the name of A. Scott Buckton, a DLS surveyor.

See also
List of rivers of Alberta

References

Rivers of Alberta